Jeremy Cooney (born August 1, 1981) is an American politician from the state of New York. A Democrat, Cooney represents the 56th district of the New York State Senate, covering parts of the City of Rochester, the Town of Brighton, and the western suburbs of Monroe County. His term of office began on January 1, 2021.

Early life and education 
Cooney was adopted from an orphanage in Kolkata, India, by a single mother in upstate New York. He was raised in Rochester and attended schools in the Rochester City School District, graduating from School of the Arts. Cooney earned his B.A. from Hobart College and his J.D. from Albany Law School, where he served as executive editor of the Albany Law Review.

Political career 
Prior to running for elected office, Cooney served as an aide to U.S. Congresswoman Louise Slaughter, a law clerk to New York Governor David Paterson, worked for Empire State Development under Andrew Cuomo, and was the first chief of staff to Mayor Lovely A. Warren of the City of Rochester.

Cooney ran for the 56th Senate District in 2018 and lost to 20 year incumbent Joseph Robach. He ran again in 2020 and won a 3 way primary election before winning the 2020 general election by a margin of 12.6%. He is the first Asian to be elected to state office from upstate New York.

Personal life 
Cooney lives in the City of Rochester with his wife, Diane Lu, a urological surgeon at the University of Rochester Medical Center.

Election Results

2018

2020

References 

1981 births
People from Brighton, Monroe County, New York
Democratic Party New York (state) state senators
People from Kolkata
American adoptees
Albany Law School alumni
Hobart and William Smith Colleges alumni
21st-century American politicians
American politicians of Indian descent
Asian-American people in New York (state) politics
Indian emigrants to the United States
Living people